Down Low may refer to:

 Down Low (album), an album by Betzefer
 Down Low (rap group), a rap group formed in Kaiserslautern, Germany
 "Down Low", a song by Doja Cat from the album Amala (2018)

See also
 The Down Low, an episode of the TV series House
 "Down Low (Nobody Has to Know)", a 1996 R&B song by R. Kelly